Norman Washington Manley  (4 July 1893 – 2 September 1969) was a Jamaican statesman who served as the first and only Premier of Jamaica.  A Rhodes Scholar, Manley became one of Jamaica's leading lawyers in the 1920s.  Manley was an advocate of universal suffrage, which was granted by the British colonial government to the colony in 1944.

Encouraged by Osmond Theodore Fairclough, who had joined forces with the brothers Frank and Ken Hill, Hedley P. Jacobs and others in 1938, he helped to launch the People's National Party which later was affiliated to the Trade Union Congress and even later the National Workers Union.  He led the PNP in every election from 1944 to 1967. Their efforts resulted in the New Constitution of 1944, granting full adult suffrage.

Manley served as the colony's Chief Minister from 1955 to 1959, and as Premier from 1959 to 1962.  He was a proponent of self-government but was persuaded to join nine other British colonies in the Caribbean territories in a Federation of the West Indies but called a referendum on the issue in 1961. Voters chose to have Jamaica withdraw from the union. He then opted to call a general election even though his five-year mandate was barely halfway through.

Early life

Norman  Manley was born to mixed-race parents in Roxborough in Jamaica's Manchester Parish. His father, Thomas Albert Samuel Manley was a small businessman born in Porus, Manchester, Jamaica in 1852.  His mother, Margaret Ann Shearer, was the daughter of a mixed-race woman (Mrs. Ann  Margaret Clarke, née Taylor, a widow) and her Irish second husband, Alexander Shearer, a pen-keeper on a farm. His paternal grandparents were Samuel Manley, a trader who had migrated from Yorkshire, and Susannah Patterson, a black woman of the Comfort Hall plantation, Manchester. Samuel Manley later married Esther Anderson Stone, a black woman of St. Elizabeth.

Thomas Manley was initially successful in citrus farming, but soon squandered his earnings through litigious activities. Once he died in 1899, Margaret Manley moved her family of four children to the Belmont estate, near Spanish Town.

Norman Manley was a brilliant scholar, soldier and athlete. He attended  Wolmer's Schools and the Beckford & Smith High School (now St. Jago High School), each for one year. He later won a full scholarship and studied at Jamaica College where he won six medals in the Jamaican schoolboy championships in 1911, including the 100 yards in 10 seconds, an island schoolboy record not broken until 1952. That time would have put young Manley into the final of that event in both the 1908 and 1912 Olympics. Following his mother's death in 1913, Manley and two siblings travelled to the UK to continue their studies. Despite being orphaned at 16, Manley earned a Rhodes Scholarship to study at Jesus College at the University of Oxford where he earned a Bachelor of Civil Law with First Class Honours.

Manley arrived in the UK shortly after World War I had begun, and visited a number of relatives, including his white cousin, Edna Manley. In her diaries published in 1969, Edna would later remark that Norman was "[a] scholar, sportsman, and a strange, strange personality. He had won the Rhodes, nearly died of typhoid, had a hundred yards record which was a world record for a schoolboy. I came into supper—full of sunshine and running. I was fourteen and he stood there in front of the empty fireplace—his hands in his pockets—swaying—handsome, faun-like—smiling mischievously ... I studied him and met a mocking smile—and something somewhere deep down touched."

Manley served in the Royal Field Artillery during World War I, and was awarded the Military Medal (M.M.) for "acts of gallantry and devotion to duty under fire".

Political career

After the war, Manley was admitted to the bar in England in 1921, and returned to Jamaica in 1922, continuing to practise law as a barrister.

In the years of the Great Depression, and during the troubles of 1938, Manley identified with the workers, donating his time and advocacy to assist them. In September of that year, Manley co-founded the People's National Party, which was tied to the Trade Union Congress and later the National Workers Union. The PNP supported the trade union movement including the Bustamante Industrial Trade Union, then led by Bustamante. At the same time, Manley worked for Universal Adult Suffrage.

In 1943, Bustamante split from the PNP, and formed his own party, called the Jamaica Labour Party (JLP). After suffrage was approved in 1944, Manley had to wait ten years (two terms) before his party was elected to office. In the 1944 elections, the JLP won an 18 percent majority of the votes over the PNP, as well as 22 seats in the 32-member House of Representatives. The PNP won 5 seats and 5 were gained by other, short-lived parties. Bustamante took office as the unofficial leader of government.

The 1949 Jamaican general election was much closer. The PNP received more votes (203,048) than the JLP (199,538), but the JLP secured more seats; 17 to the PNP's 13. Two seats were won by independents. The voter turnout was 65.2%.

In 1954, the PNP expelled Richard Hart, a Marxist, and three other PNP members for their (alleged) communist views. The other three members were Frank Hill, Ken Hill and Arthur Henry, and they were collectively referred to as "the four H's".

Hart and the other members of "the four H's" were very active in the trade union movement in Jamaica. In the 1940s and 1950s. Hart worked as a member of the executive committee of the Trade Union Council from 1946 to 1948. He served as Assistant Secretary of the Caribbean Labour Congress from 1945 to 1946 and Assistant Secretary from 1947 to 1953.

In the 1955 Jamaican general election, the PNP won for the first time, securing 18 out of 32 seats. The JLP ended up with 14 seats, and there were no independents. The voter turnout was 65.1%. As a result, Norman Manley became the new chief minister.

The 1959 Jamaican general election was held on 28 July 1959, and the number of seats was increased to 45. The PNP secured a wider margin of victory, taking 29 seats to the JLP's 16.

Chief Minister of Jamaica
Manley served as chief minister from 1955 to 1959.

The Facilities for Title Act of 1955 enabled people who occupy land for more than 7 years to obtain credit for development. The Loans To Small Business Act was passed in 1956 "to provide for the establishment of a board to grant loans and other forms of financial assistance to persons engaged in carrying on small businesses."

One of his biggest goals as chief minister was to make sure all children had access to a public education. The Jamaica Institute of Technology was established in 1958, and that same year Caledonia Junior College was established under the Emergency Teacher Training Scheme to address the shortage of trained teachers. The Education Law was amended in 1958 so that the old education department of the colonial period might be integrated into the ministry, and that the constitutional responsibility of the minister for the entire educational system might be fully established. A five-year education plan of 1955 was expanded into a ten-year plan in 1957, and by the following year 15% of government funds were being spent on education. Some of this money was allocated towards a programme of grants-in-aids that brought secondary education within the reach of many more children. In 1958, the Common Entrance examination was introduced, which offered an unprecedented 2,000 free places in high schools each year (previously, most high-school students were the fee-paying children of the well-to-do, with only a handful of parish scholarships available through which the bright poor could gain access).

Premier of Jamaica
Manley was appointed Jamaica's first premier on 14 August 1959.<ref>Michael Burke, "Norman Manley as premier", Jamaica Observer, 13 August 2014 http://www.jamaicaobserver.com/columns/Norman-Manley-as-premier_17349996 Retrieved 10 September 2020.</ref>

As premier, Manley renegotiated a government contract with bauxite companies, leading to a sixfold increase in revenue. His government also set the dominant economic agenda for the future in Jamaica by establishing statutory boards, government bodies, and quasi-government authorities to regulate and play an active role in industry.

Industrialization, increased agricultural production, and agrarian reform figured large in the People's National Party's plan for a great leap forward. According to Philip Sherlock, five years after he took office, Manley was able to claim that much had been done to correct the imbalance in the distribution of land in Jamaica. Of the country's 2.2 million acres (8900 km2) of usable land, 1.2 million acres (4850 km2) were in the hands of people who owned under 500 acres (2 km2) each, and 0.7 million acres (2830 km2) were held by those who owned properties of over 500 acres (2 km2).

According to a 1954–55 census, there were 198,000 farmers with holdings of under 500 acres (2 km2). There had been a great shift in land ownership (which was continuing), and steps were also taken to ensure that idle acres were put to use, with Manley repeating a "commonplace thought," that the ownership of land was a sacred obligation, and that no country could afford to regard land as unfettered private property because the life of the whole community depended on it. The Manley Government showed that it meant business by passing a Land Bonds Law that gave powers for the compulsory acquisition of land and provided the means for compensation.

Thousands of small farmers were provided with subsidies, while new markets were opened for increase of products in various fields. The Jamaica Broadcasting Corporation was set up for public education and entertainment as well as to encourage Jamaican creative talent, public library facilities were extended to all parishes, and primary schools were built.

Agricultural aid was also increased during Manley's time in office. Rather than giving subsidies, as the Jamaican Labour Party had done, incentives were offered and facilities for soft loans were provided. The money allocated for agricultural credit went up from £182,000 in 1954 to £893,000 in 1959 and to £947,000 in 1961. Money was available for land reclamation, dairy farming, fish farming, water and irrigation, improved land use, fertiliser programmes and the like.

In 1960, a pension scheme for sugar workers was introduced. The Shops and Offices Act was passed in May 1961 to provide for "the regulation of the hours of business of shops and offices and for the welfare and the regulation of the hours of work of persons employed in or about the business of shops and offices."

The West Indies Federation
Manley was a strong advocate of the Federation of the West Indies as a means of propelling Jamaica into self-government. When Bustamante declared that the opposition JLP would take Jamaica out of the Federation, Manley, already renowned for his commitment to democracy, called for a referendum, unprecedented in Jamaica, to let the people decide.

In the 1961 Federation membership referendum Jamaica voted 54% to leave the West Indies Federation. The vote was decidedly against Jamaica's continued membership in the Federation. Manley, after arranging Jamaica's orderly withdrawal from the union, set up a joint committee to decide on a constitution for separate independence for Jamaica.

Manley chaired the committee and led the team that negotiated independence. And then he called the election that was to see him become Leader of the Opposition instead of Jamaica's first Prime Minister. Manley took Jamaica to the polls in April 1962, to secure a mandate for the island's independence. On 10 April 1962, of the 45 seats up for contention in the 1962 Jamaican general election, the JLP won 26 seats and the PNP 19. The voter turnout was 72.9%.

This resulted in the independence of Jamaica on 6 August 1962, and several other British colonies in the West Indies followed suit in the next decade. Bustamante had replaced Manley as premier between April and August, and on independence, he became Jamaica's first prime minister.

Later years

Manley lost the next election to the JLP. In the 1967 Jamaican general election, the JLP were victorious again, winning 33 out of 53 seats, with the PNP taking 20 seats.

He gave his last years of service as Leader of the Opposition, establishing definitively the role of the parliamentary opposition in a developing nation. In his last public address to an annual conference of the PNP, he said: 
"I say that the mission of my generation was to win self-government for Jamaica. To win political power which is the final power for the black masses of my country from which I spring. I am proud to stand here today and say to you who fought that fight with me, say it with gladness and pride: Mission accomplished for my generation."
He added:
"And what is the mission of this generation?… It is…reconstructing the social and economic society and life of Jamaica."

Due to respiratory illness, Manley retired from politics on his birthday in 1969. He died later that year, on 2 September 1969. His tomb was designed by the critically acclaimed Jamaican sculptor, Christopher Gonzalez.

Marriage and family

As a young man, he married his maternal cousin Edna Manley (née Swithenbank) (1 March 1900 – 2 February 1987) in 1921. They had two children together. Their second son, Michael Norman Manley, went into politics and rose to become the fourth Prime Minister of Jamaica. The elder son, Douglas Manley, became a university lecturer, politician and government minister.

Manley was a member of Alpha Phi Alpha fraternity. Manley's speech entitled, To Unite in a Common Battle was delivered in 1945 at the fraternity's Thirty-first General Convention in Chicago, Illinois. 

Legacy and honours

After his death, Manley, and his still-living cousin Bustamante, were proclaimed National Heroes of Jamaica on 18 October 1969, joining the black nationalist Marcus Garvey, nineteenth-century hero Paul Bogle, and nineteenth-century politician George William Gordon. Manley, also being the former Premier and Chief Minister of Jamaica, can be seen on the Jamaican Five Dollar Coin, being portrayed as the country's national hero.

 Notes 

 Bibliography 
 Ranston, Jackie, Lawyer Manley: Vol. 1 First Time Up'', University of the West Indies Press, 1999, 

Also the First Prime Minister of Jamaica.

Prime Ministers of Jamaica
National Heroes of Jamaica
Jamaican Rhodes Scholars
Alumni of Jesus College, Oxford
Royal Field Artillery soldiers
1893 births
1969 deaths
20th-century Jamaican lawyers
Jamaican Queen's Counsel
Jamaican nationalists
Jamaican monarchists
Jamaican people of English descent
Jamaican people of Irish descent
Recipients of the Military Medal
People from Manchester Parish
People's National Party (Jamaica) politicians
Colony of Jamaica people
British Army personnel of World War I
Norman
Jamaican independence activists